Martijn Maaskant (born 27 July 1983) is a retired Dutch professional road racing cyclist. Maaskant competed professionally between 2008 and 2014.

Biography
After the 2014 season, Maaskant retired from professional cycling.

Born in Zuidland, South Holland, Netherlands, Maaskant currently resides in Lanaken, Flanders, Belgium.

Career achievements

Major results
Sources:

2003
 1st Stage 3 Olympia's Tour
2005
 6th Beverbeek Classic
 7th Overall Olympia's Tour
 9th Grote Prijs Stad Zottegem
 9th Paris–Roubaix Espoirs
2006
 1st Stage 4 Tour de Normandie
 2nd Hel van het Mergelland
 10th GP Herning
 10th Overall Olympia's Tour
2007
 1st Ronde van Drenthe
 1st Stage 1 Circuito Montañés
 1st Overall Tour de Normandie
 2nd Overall Olympia's Tour
1st Stage 2
 2nd Overall Circuit de Lorraine
1st Stage 4
 2nd Overall Le Triptyque des Monts et Châteaux
 2nd Beverbeek Classic
 6th Grand Prix Pino Cerami
 10th Schaal Sels-Merksem
2008
 4th Paris–Roubaix
 4th Monte Paschi Eroica
 7th Dutch Food Valley Classic
2009
 1st Stage 1 (TTT) Tour of Qatar
 4th Tour of Flanders
 7th Overall Three Days of De Panne
2011
 7th Omloop Het Nieuwsblad

Grand Tour general classification results timeline

References

External links

Cycling Base: Martijn Maaskant
Cycling Quotient: Martijn Maaskant
UnitedHealthcare: Martijn Maaskant

1983 births
Living people
Dutch male cyclists
People from Bernisse
Cyclists from South Holland
20th-century Dutch people
21st-century Dutch people